Paul H. Rogers House is a historic home located at Hartsville, Darlington County, South Carolina.  It was built in 1927, and is a two-story, five-bay, rectangular frame Colonial Revival style residence. It has a hipped roof. The front facade features an iron balustraded balcony supported by two Tuscan order columns. The second story features a four-part Palladian window above the balcony.  It was the home of Paul. H. Rogers (1883-1960), prominent Hartsville industrialist and businessman who served as president of Carolina Fiber Company and as mayor of Hartsville.

It was listed on the National Register of Historic Places in 1994.

References

Houses on the National Register of Historic Places in South Carolina
Colonial Revival architecture in South Carolina
Houses completed in 1927
Houses in Hartsville, South Carolina
National Register of Historic Places in Darlington County, South Carolina